After the Korean War, the first major Cold War crisis began on 13 August 1961, when Berliners woke up to find they lived in a divided city. A wall now separated East Berlin from West Berlin. With that provocative act, the Soviet Union ratcheted up the Cold War.

In response to Soviet moves to cut off allied access to Berlin, The Air National Guard was mobilized in October 1961. included 18 tactical fighter squadrons, 4 tactical reconnaissance squadrons, 6 air transport squadrons, and a tactical control group. On 1 November; the Air Force mobilized three more ANG fighter interceptor squadrons. In late October and early November, eight of the tactical fighter units flew to Europe with their 216 aircraft in operation "Stair Step," the largest jet deployment in the Air Guard's history.

The Vietnam War provided the next significant test for the Air Guard, with Airlift units began flying supply missions to Vietnam in 1965.  However, for largely domestic political reasons, President Lyndon B. Johnson chose not to mobilize most of the nation's reserve forces before 1968. However, after the 1968 Tet Offensive in which the Communist North Vietnamese and Vietcong troops attacked positions throughout the Republic of Vietnam, the ANG was mobilized for service.

The ANG was mobilized twice during the Vietnam War. Four tactical fighter squadrons—the 120th (Colorado), 174th (Iowa), 188th (New Mexico), and 136th (New York)--deployed to Vietnam in 1968.  And although not an Air National Guard unit, the National Guard can claim credit for a fifth squadron, the 355th: 85% of this tactical fighter squadron's personnel were Air Guard volunteers from New Jersey and the District of Columbia.

Eleven additional squadrons were called up in 1968 in response to the seizing of the U.S. Navy ship Pueblo by North Korea, and two tactical fighter squadrons, the 166th (Ohio) and the 127th (Kansas) were sent to South Korea. In May 1968 one aeromedical airservice group and two tactical fighter groups were federalized.

The last of the mobilized Air National Guard units returned to reserve status in June 1969. Guardsmen, however, continued to support active-duty units in South Vietnam with specialized missions until 1972.

 Note: Due to DOD budget restrictions, the provisional 7108th, 7117th, 7121st, 7122d and 7123d Tactical Wings consisted only of the wing headquarters squadron and a single fighter squadron in France.  The remaining wing components and attached fighter squadrons remained in the United States, ready to deploy if necessary.  Personnel and aircraft of the CONUS-based squadrons rotated to France during the period of the wing deployment to reduce the deployment periods of the overseas personnel.  The 106th TRS, 149th TFS, 166th TFS, 163d TFS and 170th TFS deployed personnel/equipment/aircraft.

After the Air National Guard unit personnel returned to the United States,  USAFE formed the active-duty 366th Tactical Fighter Wing and four Tactical Fighter Squadrons from the equipment and F-84F aircraft deployed by the ANG units at the French bases used by the provisional Tactical Wings.

See also
 Air National Guard

References

 PUEBLO CRISIS AND VIETNAM WAR MOBILIZATIONS 1968-1969
 Prelude To Total Force: The Air National Guard 1943-1969, United States Air Force General Histories. Office Of Air Force History; 1St Edition, 1985 
  
 McAuliffe, Jerome J. (2005). US Air Force in France 1950-1967. San Diego, California: Milspec Press. .
 Individual unit histories of above listed units

 
Lists of military units and formations
Air National Guard Mobilizations